Spalding may refer to:

People
 Spalding (surname)
 Spalding Gray (1941–2004), American actor, screenwriter, and playwright
 Spalding (comics), a fictional character from The Adventures of Tintin by Hergé

Places
Australia
 Spalding, South Australia, a town north of the Clare Valley
 Spalding, Western Australia, a suburb of Geraldton

Canada
 Rural Municipality of Spalding No. 368, Saskatchewan
 Spalding, Saskatchewan, a village

England
Spalding, Lincolnshire
Spalding Rural District, a rural district in Holland, Lincolnshire, England from 1894 to 1974
Spalding Moor, a wetland in the East Riding of Yorkshire

United States
 Spalding, Georgia
 Spalding, Idaho
 Spalding, Missouri
 Spalding, Nebraska
 Spalding County, Georgia
 Spalding Township, Michigan
 Spalding Township, Minnesota

Other 
 Clan Spalding, Scottish Sept of Clan Murray
 King & Spalding, American law firm in Atlanta, Georgia, US
 Spalding (company), American sporting goods company 
 Spalding Club, nineteenth-century antiquarian society, publishing at Aberdeen
 Spalding Gentlemen's Society, English club founded in 1710 at Spalding, Lincolnshire
 Spalding Grammar School, a selective school on Priory Road in Spalding, Lincolnshire, England
 Spalding High School (disambiguation), the name of several high schools
 Spalding House, a historic building belonging to the Honolulu Museum of Art
 Spalding Method, a program for teaching students to read by first teaching them to write
 Spalding Priory, a small Benedictine house founded as a cell of Croyland Abbey in 1052
 Spalding railway station serves the town of Spalding, Lincolnshire, England
 Spalding Rockwell is a punk/electro/pop band
 Spalding United F.C., a football club based in Spalding, Lincolnshire, England
 Spalding University, a private university in Louisville, Kentucky
 Spalding v Gamage, a leading decision of the House of Lords on the tort of passing off
 Spalding & Hodge, paper makers and wholesale stationers based in London, founded 1789

 Spalding World Tour

See also 
 Spaulding (disambiguation)
 Justice Spalding (disambiguation)